Ngomba may be,

Ngomba language
Ngomba Bila (William II of Bimbia)